Tête-à-Tête is a duet album by saxophonist Art Pepper and pianist George Cables recorded in 1982 and released on the Galaxy label.

Reception

The AllMusic review by Scott Yanow noted "Pepper never did decline on record, and although he died in June 1982 (just a month after the last of these duets), he is prime form throughout the emotional performances".

Track listing 
 "Over the Rainbow" (Harold Arlen, Yip Harburg) - 6:43 	
 "Tête-à-Tête" (George Cables) - 4:29
 "Darn That Dream" (Jimmy Van Heusen, Eddie DeLange) - 4:17 	
 "Body and Soul" (Johnny Green, Frank Eyton, Edward Heyman, Robert Sour) - 5:17
 "The Way You Look Tonight" (Jerome Kern, Dorothy Fields) - 6:47 	
 "'Round Midnight" (Thelonious Monk, Cootie Williams, Bernie Hanighen) - 5:40 	
 "You Go to My Head" (J. Fred Coots, Haven Gillespie) - 6:04 
Recorded at Fantasy Studios in Berkeley, CA on April 13, 1982 (track 4), April 14, 1982 (tracks 1-3, 5 & 6) and May 11, 1982 (track 7)

Personnel 
Art Pepper - alto saxophone 
George Cables - piano

References 

Art Pepper albums
George Cables albums
1983 albums
Galaxy Records albums
Collaborative albums